43rd Division may refer to:

Infantry divisions
 43rd Division (People's Republic of China)
 43rd Reserve Division (German Empire), a unit of the Imperial German Army 
 43rd Division (North Korea), a unit of the North Korean Army 
 43rd (Wessex) Infantry Division, a unit of the United Kingdom Army 
 43rd Infantry Division (United States), a unit of the United States Army 
 43rd Division (Imperial Japanese Army), a unit of the Imperial Japanese Army
 43rd Infantry Division (Somalia), a unit of the Somali National Army.

Cavalry divisions
 43rd Cavalry Division (Soviet Union)

Armoured divisions
 43rd Tank Division (Soviet Union)

Aviation divisions
 43d Air Division, a unit of the United States Air Force

See also
 43rd Group (disambiguation)
 43rd Brigade (disambiguation)
 43rd Regiment (disambiguation)
 43rd Battalion (disambiguation)
 43rd Squadron (disambiguation)